Andhra Muslim College, founded in 1984, is located in Guntur City, India. It offers graduate and undergraduate courses. It is recognized by the Acharya Nagarjuna University, Guntur.

History 
The city campus was established in 1984.

Departments
 Courses: Bachelors in Arts, Science, Mathematics

References

External links

Colleges in Guntur
Educational institutions established in 1984
1984 establishments in Andhra Pradesh